"Won't You (Be There)" is a song by English electronic music duo Nero. It was released on 19 October 2012, peaking at number 156 on the UK Singles Chart and number 29 on the UK Dance Chart. The song was written by Richard Hall, Daniel Stephens, Joseph Ray and Alana Watson. The song samples "Thousand" by Moby (Richard Hall). "Won't You (Be There)" and its B-side track "Etude" both feature as new tracks from Welcome Reality +, the 2012 re-issue of their debut album.

The song was featured in the soundtrack for the 2012 video game, Need for Speed: Most Wanted.

Track listing

Chart performance

Release history

References

Nero (band) songs
2012 singles
MTA Records singles
2012 songs
Songs written by Moby